Sar Qaleh (also Romanized as Sar Qal‘eh; also known as Sar Qal‘eh-ye Mīlās) is a village in Milas Rural District, in the Central District of Lordegan County, Chaharmahal and Bakhtiari Province, Iran. At the 2006 census, its population was 561, in 110 families.

References 

Populated places in Lordegan County